Sid Domic (born ) is an Australian former professional rugby league footballer who played in the 1990s and 2000s. He played in several positions for several clubs. Domic played in Australia for the Brisbane Broncos and the Penrith Panthers, and in England for the London Broncos, the Warrington Wolves, the Wakefield Trinity Wildcats (Heritage No. 1215), and Hull F.C.

Background
Of Aboriginal descent, while attending North Rockhampton State High School, Domic played for the Australian Schoolboys team in 1991 and 1992.

Professional playing career
Domic went on to play for the Brisbane Broncos and Penrith Panthers in the New South Wales Rugby League premiership before moving to England.

His Super League days have taken him from Warrington, Wakefield Trinity and Hull FC.

Domic scored the winning try at the first local derby to be played in the Super League between Hull F.C. and their local rivals Hull Kingston Rovers.

Domic was released from the Hull F.C. quota on 26 June to allow Mathew Head to play for the club.

In 2008, he joined the Dewsbury Rams.

Post-playing
In 2010 Domic's artistic ability led him to be selected from a field of six artists to design the Indigenous All Stars' jersey, as well as Johnathan Thurston's custom headgear, for the annual NRL All Stars matches. Much of his own knowledge in this area has been passed down to him from his grandmother, Ivy Domic. Through his fame from his playing career, he has visited children at many schools to expose them to Aboriginal culture and his work has been exhibited at the Rebecca Hossack Gallery in the U.K.

References

External links
Statistics at broncos.com.au

1975 births
Living people
Australian rugby league players
Australian expatriate sportspeople in England
Indigenous Australian rugby league players
Brisbane Broncos players
London Broncos players
Wakefield Trinity players
Hull F.C. players
Dewsbury Rams players
Australian Aboriginal artists
Penrith Panthers players
Warrington Wolves players
Rugby league utility players
Rugby league players from Canberra